"You're So Good When You're Bad" is a song written by Ben Peters, and recorded by American country music artist Charley Pride.  It was released in July 1982 as the fourth single from the album Charley Sings Everybody's Choice.  The song was Pride's twenty-seventh number one single on the country chart.  The single went to number one for one week and spent a total of twelve weeks on the country chart.

Charts

References

Charley Pride songs
1982 singles
Songs written by Ben Peters
Song recordings produced by Norro Wilson
RCA Records singles
1982 songs